Forelle (German for trout) may refer to:

 "Die Forelle" (D. 550), a song by Franz Schubert (1797–1828)
 A foundry type; see Rheingold at Trennert Type Foundry#Typefaces
 A cultivar of pear

See also
 Forellenquintett (Trout Quintet), a piano quintet (D 667) by Franz Schubert